The Avadānaśataka or "Century of Noble Deeds (Avadāna)" is an anthology in Sanskrit of one hundred Buddhist legends, approximately dating to the same time as the Ashokavadana. Ratnamālāvadāna. The work may be from the Mulasarvastivada school.

References

External links 
 

Buddhist texts